Black Irish, in its original usage, is the Black Irish (ethnic group) – Irish people, or those in the diaspora of Irish heritage, who have black hair, dark eyes, and a darker complexion than most (pale) Irish people. 

It may also refer to

 Black people in Ireland – people of African or other "Black" heritage living in Ireland

In entertainment and media
 Black Irish (album), 2017 music album by American singer-songwriter Shannon McNally
 Black Irish (film), 2007 independent film by Brad Gann
 Black Irish Band, American folk music musical group
 Black Irish Books, publishing house of American author Steven Pressfield
 Black Irish Elm, wych elm cultivar originally discovered in Ireland